Thom van Bergen (born 6 January 2004) is a Dutch football player. He plays as a centre-forward for Eredivisie club Groningen.

Career
He made his Eredivisie debut for Groningen on 8 January 2023 in a game against Excelsior. as a starter.

References

External links
 

2004 births
Footballers from Groningen (city)
Living people
Dutch footballers
Association football forwards
FC Groningen players
Eredivisie players